The Women's two-woman bobsleigh competition at the 2002 Winter Olympics in Salt Lake City, United States was held on 19 February, at Park City. The event was contested for the first time in Olympic history.

Results

Each of the 15 two-woman teams entered for the event completed both runs.

References

Bobsleigh at the 2002 Winter Olympics
Women's bobsleigh at the 2002 Winter Olympics
2002 in bobsleigh
Women's events at the 2002 Winter Olympics
Bob